Lluta District is one of twenty districts of the Caylloma Province in Peru.

Geography
Other mountains are listed below:

References

Districts of the Caylloma Province
Districts of the Arequipa Region